Jamie Osborne (born 16 November 2001) is an Irish rugby union player, currently playing for United Rugby Championship and European Rugby Champions Cup side Leinster. His preferred position is fullback.

Leinster
He made his debut in the same match, coming on as a replacement.

Ireland
In January 2023, Osborne was named in the Ireland squad for the 2023 Six Nations Championship.

References

External links

2001 births
Living people
Irish rugby union players
Leinster Rugby players
Rugby union fullbacks
Rugby union centres
Rugby union wings